Night Zoo is a 1987 Canadian film.  It is directed and written by Jean-Claude Lauzon. It made its debut at the 1987 Cannes Film Festival. The film was selected as the Canadian entry for the Best Foreign Language Film at the 60th Academy Awards, but was not accepted as a nominee.

It was also the most successful film in the history of the Academy of Canadian Cinema and Television's film awards program, winning a record 13 Genie Awards in every single category where it was nominated. The film garnered 14 nominations overall; the film's only nomination that failed to translate into a win was Gilles Maheu's nod for Best Actor, as he lost to the film's other Best Actor nominee, Roger Lebel.

Plot
Marcel (Gilles Maheu) is released from prison, hoping to reconcile with his dying father, Albert (Lebel). Marcel is also harassed by a corrupt gay cop. Marcel returns to his father who reveals that he has money and drugs stashed away for him. Marcel and his gay former cellmate both corner the corrupt cop and get their revenge on him. Julie (Adams) is Marcel's former girlfriend who works in a sex club peep show.

Reception
The film grossed $1 million in Quebec within three months of its release. The film won the most Genie Awards in history, with thirteen awards.

Awards
The film set a record by winning 13 Genie Awards.

 Genie Award for Best Motion Picture - Roger Frappier, Pierre Gendron
 Genie Award for Best Achievement in Art Direction/Production Design - Jean-Baptiste Tard
 Genie Award for Best Achievement in Cinematography - Guy Dufaux
 Genie Award for Best Achievement in Costume Design - Andrée Morin
 Genie Award for Best Achievement in Direction - Jean-Claude Lauzon
 Genie Award for Best Achievement in Editing - Michel Arcand
 Genie Award for Best Achievement in Overall Sound - Adrian Croll, Hans Peter Strobl, Yvon Benoît
 Genie Award for Best Achievement in Sound Editing - Viateur Paiement, Marcel Pothier, Diane Boucher
 Genie Award for Best Achievement in Music - Original Score - Jean Corriveau
 Genie Award for Best Achievement in Music - Original Song - Jean-Pierre Bonin, Daniel DeShaime, Jean Corriveau, Robert Stanley For the song "Lost in a Hurricane"
 Genie Award for Best Performance by an Actor in a Leading Role - Roger Lebel
 Genie Award for Best Performance by an Actor in a Supporting Role - Germain Houde
 Genie Award for Best Original Screenplay - Jean-Claude Lauzon
 Montreal World Film Festival Best Canadian Film - Jean-Claude Lauzon
 Toronto International Film Festival International Critics' Award - Jean-Claude Lauzon
 Flanders International Film Festival Grand Prix - Jean-Claude Lauzon

Nominations 
 Genie Award for Best Performance by an Actor in a Leading Role - Gilles Maheu

Availability
The film was released on videocassette in the United States in 1988 by New World and in Canada that same year by Cinema Plus Video. In 1991, an EP-Mode tape of the film was released by Starmaker Video. After Lauzon was killed in the northern Quebec plane crash in 1997, CBC Television, Télé-Québec and Showcase aired Night Zoo and Léolo in August.  To this day, Night Zoo has never been released on DVD and as of June 28, 2011, no plans have been made to release the film onto DVD. It was digitized and restored in May 2013 by Éléphant and is available for online rental on the iTunes Store.

See also
 List of submissions to the 60th Academy Awards for Best Foreign Language Film
 List of Canadian submissions for the Academy Award for Best Foreign Language Film

References

Works cited

External links

 

1987 films
1980s crime drama films
Canadian LGBT-related films
LGBT-related drama films
1987 LGBT-related films
Best Picture Genie and Canadian Screen Award winners
Films shot in Montreal
Films set in Montreal
Films directed by Jean-Claude Lauzon
Canadian crime drama films
1987 drama films
French-language Canadian films
1980s Canadian films